Paappan is a 2022 Malayalam-language crime thriller film directed by Joshiy and produced jointly by Gokulam Gopalan, David Kachappilly and Raaffi Mathirra.The film was written by RJ Shaan.The film stars Suresh Gopi in the title role along with Gokul Suresh, Neeta Pillai, Asha Sharath, Nyla Usha, Kaniha and Ajmal Ameer appear in supporting roles.

Paappan was released on 29 July 2022. The film received mixed to positive reviews from critics and has emerged as a commercial success. The film made its digital premiere on 7 September 2022 on ZEE5.

Plot
 
The corpse of Superstar Ravi Varman is found in Pulimala forest. The Kerala Police headed by ASP Vincy Abraham investigate. She suspects Ravi's driver Bullet Rajan, after they discover Rajan's criminal history, his case was investigated by Vincy's estranged father CI Abraham Mathan Mathew aka Paappan. Inspecting the corpse, the cops discover it was Rajan, who was murdered, whilst Ravi is missing. During the postmortem, Vincy learns that Rajan was killed in a way to resemble a heart attack, she also learns there were female prints, along with Ravi's and Rajan's, in Ravi's car. Learning Ravi is shooting a film, Vincy's team interviews him, and Ravi reveals he was having an affair with actress Hiranmayi. 

Rajan had dropped them at his farmhouse and left to meet someone in Pulimala. He was shocked to learn of his death from the news. Vincy's team find a riddle 26 (written on Rajan's toes) and a double-edged dagger named Bull's eye dagger, they conclude a suspect named Iruttan Chacko is the serial killer. SP Bhaskar Shenoy appoints Paappan to investigate the case with Vincy. The next morning, CI Soman's corpse is found in Trivandrum. Vincy learns that Soman was killed the same way as Rajan and had the number 8 written on him. It is revealed that Chacko killed Paappan's wife Nancy, when she tried to save Paappan from being killed. The dagger was missing, but Paappan planted a dagger and Chacko was imprisoned, but Paappan's ploy was discovered and was suspended by the police. 

One night, a stranger sneaks into forensic doctor Sherly Somasundaram's house. Sherly informs Vincy, who assumes the stranger is Chacko and tries to catch him, to no avail. Vincy receives footage of Paappan meeting Chacko in prison and with the help of an analyser, she suspects Paappan of having Chacko hired as the killer. While checking people who met Chacko, Vincy learns that a nun, Aisha Fathima, came to visit Chacko. In her interview, she reveals that she used to take care of Chacko's mother Kunjamma. At his address, Vincy finds Chacko chained-up and concludes someone else is behind the killings. Paappan and Vincy interrogate Chacko and tell him to confess to the killings, to flush out the real killer, but to no avail. 

Bhaskar holds a press meeting and falsely closes the case in order to lure the real killer. One day, Vincy's husband Siddharth receives a package containing the dagger and a book titled Rahasya with pages 95 and 96 torn, which leads them to suspect the numbers could be a date 26-8-95/96. They spy on the book's author Dr. Priya Nalini Draupadi, however, Vincy learns that Priya's husband Adv. Jayashankar was the killer's target and he is killed in a car explosion. With the help of his son Michael, Paappan learns about Simon, who was accused of stealing a golden cross from the church of Pulimala, he learns that Simon and his upper-caste classmate Bennitta Issac Puthenpuraykal were in love, but her family learnt this and fixed Bennita's marriage to someone else on 26 August 1996. 

Bennitta's family members; her father Issac, mother Kathrina, brother Fr. Bennett had died mysteriously. Using age progression technology, Paappan scans Bennitta's photo and finds that Sherly Somasundaram is Bennitta, and kidnaps her with Michael's help, it was Michael who had sneaked into Sherly's house as Paappan was suspicious about her from the beginning. Paappan reveals the findings to Bhaskar and Vincy, where Vincy learns that Jayashankar, Soman and Bennitta's brother Fr. Bennet were college friends. Paappan interrogates Sherly/Bennitta and learns that Simon was brutally murdered by her family, Rajan, Jayashankar, Soman and Fr. Bennet. Helplessly Bennitta watched Simon being killed and blamed for stealing the cross. 

Bennitta vowed vengeance and had secretly killed her family members. Vincy also received Jayashankar's confession about the honour killing. Paappan and Bhaskar find Simon's body and prove his innocence. Paappan reveals that Simon's younger brother Solomon was also involved with Sherly/Bennitta, where he receives a call from Solomon, who had kidnapped Vincy. Paappan meets Solomon at a church and it is revealed that Paappan was also present at Simon's death but couldn't help him as a young Vincy was falling sick while on a holiday and took her to hospital. Solomon locks Vincy in a shed and sets it alight. In a fight, Paappan kills Solomon and saves Vincy, but is arrested for killing Solomon. Three years later, Paappan is released from prison and reunites with Vincy and his family.

Cast 

 Suresh Gopi as CI Abraham Mathew "Mathan" aka Paappan
Gokul Suresh as Michael, Paappan's foster son
 Neeta Pillai as ASP Vincy Abraham IPS, Paappan's and Nancy's daughter (voiceover by Riya Saira)
 Baby Kanmani as young Vincy Abraham
 Asha Sharath as forensic Dr. Sherly Somasundaram / Bennitta Issac John
 Manasa Radhakrishnan as young Bennitta Issac (Kunjumol)
 Nyla Usha as Nancy Abraham, Paappan's wife and Vincy's mother
 Kaniha as Sussan, Michael's mother (voiceover by Vimmy Mariam George)
 Vijayaraghavan as SP Bhaskar Shenoy  IPS
 Chandunath as Sidharth Nath / Sidharthan / Sidhan, Vincy's husband 
Ajmal Ameer as Simon & Solomon (dual role)
 Janardhanan as Rtd. Forensic Surgeon Dr. Pattabhiraman
 Sajitha Madathil as Kathrina Puthenpuraykal, Bennitta's mother
 Nandhu as ASI Raghavan / Raghavettan
 Tini Tom as CI Soman Nair
 Shammi Thilakan as killer Iruttan Chacko
 Abhishek Raveendran as SI Sabu
 Dayyana Hameed as Rituparna
 Sadhika Venugopal as constable Girija
 Baiju Jose as forensic officer Nandan 
 Sreejith Ravi as driver "Bullet" Rajan
 Rahul Madhav as super star Ravi Varman aka Raviji
 Jewel Mary as writer Dr. Priya Nalini / Draupadi (cameo)
 Malavika Menon as Anitha / Aisha Fathima
 Rosin Jolly as Ravi Varman's wife
 Parvathi T. as Dr. Radhika Menon
 Preetha Pradeep as police officer's wife
 Chali Pala as ASI Sathyanath
 Nirmal Palazhi as Issac John Puthenpuraykal, Bennitta's father
 Srikanth Murali as police surgeon
 Madan Mohan as Benett Issac, Bennitta's elder brother
 Benzi Mathews as Advocate Jayashankar, Priya Nalini's husband
 Nandhu Pothuval as Pothuval, Ravi Varman's manager
 Kottayam Ramesh as judge
 Sinoj Varghese as Paulose
 Savithri Sreedharan as Kunjamma, Chacko's mother
 Sanuja Somanath as forensic assistant Anupama
 Saniya Babu as Nithya
 Laya Simpson as Mariyam
 Jordi Poonjar
 Sundarapandiyan as police officer 
George Abraham as police officer

Production 
On 14 February 2021, Suresh Gopi announced that he will be teaming up with director Joshiy for his 252nd venture. Writer RJ Shaan, cinematographer Ajay David Kachappilly and composer Jakes Bejoy were also reported to be part of the film. The official title Paappan was announced with a poster on the following day. According to the writer, it is a family-oriented film.

Nyla Usha was reported to play the female lead. Sunny Wayne, Neeta Pillai, Gokul Suresh, Kaniha and Asha Sharath were also signed to be part of the film. The film marks the first time on-screen collaboration of Suresh Gopi and son Gokul Suresh. The cast additions included Chandhunadh, Vijayaraghavan, Tini Tom and Shammi Thilakan. Jewel Mary was reported to make a cameo appearance in the film. Actress Dayyana Hameed confirmed her inclusion in the film, stating that she will play the role of a contemporary dancer. Kaniha plays Gopi's Sister in the film.

Principal photography began on 5 March 2021 in Kanjirappally. The same day, Gopi shared an image of his character with a salt and pepper look. On 10 March 2021, Gopi was hospitalized after being infected with pneumonia while shooting. On his discharge, he was asked to contest as the NDA candidate in the 2021 Kerala Legislative Assembly election from Thrissur and began campaigning. He rejoined the sets of the film post elections.

Release 
Paappan was released on 29 July 2022.

Box office 
Paapan took a worldwide opening of ₹4 crores with ₹3.5 crores and ₹11 crores on the first weekend in Kerala and ₹14 crore worldwide.The film grossed over 35 crores from the Indian box office and collected ₹50 crore worldwide in 20 days.

See also
List of Malayalam films of 2022

References

External links
 
 Paappan at Zee5

2020s Malayalam-language films
Indian crime thriller films
Indian serial killer films
Films about organised crime in India
Fictional portrayals of the Kerala Police
Films shot in Thiruvananthapuram
Films scored by Jakes Bejoy
2022 crime thriller films
Films directed by Joshiy